Kapilmuni Union is a union parishad in Paikgachha Upazila of Khulna District, in Khulna Division, Bangladesh. In 2022, archaeological excavation in the Rezakpur village of Kapilmuni Union revealed ruins of ancient human settlement dating back to the early middle ages.

References

Unions of Paikgachha Upazila
Populated places in Khulna District